Avaz is a village in Gazik Rural District of Gazik District, Darmian County, South Khorasan province, Iran. At the 2006 National Census, its population was 1,760 in 404 households. The following census in 2011 counted 1,934 people in 509 households. The latest census in 2016 showed a population of 1,696 people in 457 households; it was the largest village in its rural district.

References 

Darmian County

Populated places in South Khorasan Province

Populated places in Darmian County